Afghanistan competed at the 2022 World Athletics Championships in Eugene, United States, from 15 to 24 July 2022. Said Gilani was the only athlete representing Afghanistan for the third consecutive championships, in the men's 100 metres event.

Results
 including alternates

Men 
Track and road events

References

World Championships in Athletics
2022
Nations at the 2022 World Athletics Championships